Hanft is a surname. Notable people with the surname include:

Adam Hanft, brand strategist
Helen Hanft (1934–2013), American actress
Karl Hanft (1904–1982), Austrian actor
Steve Hanft (born 1966), American film and video director

Surnames of German origin